Raimundo Moacir Mendes Feitosa (born January 9, 1950, in Teresina) is a Brazilian teacher and politician. He was president of the PDT in São Luís (1980–2013). Feitosa is a municipal secretary of São Luís, also was secretary of João Castelo until 2010 when he left office.

References 

Democratic Labour Party (Brazil) politicians
Christian Labour Party politicians
Living people
1950 births